1–2 Orme Square is a Grade II listed pair of houses in Orme Square, Bayswater, London, W2.

The houses were built in the early-19th century and according to rate books No.1 was first occupied in 1826, along with No.3 to the east, followed by No.2 in 1827.

There is an LCC plaque on number 1 to Sir Rowland Hill, (1795–1879), postal reformer, who lived there from 1839 to 1842, while he was introducing the penny post.

No 2 was the home of George Lascelles, 7th Earl of Harewood, and his son,  David Lascelles, 8th Earl of Harewood, who was born there. When the 7th Earl divorced his wife, Marion Stein, in 1967 the house passed to her for her lifetime. When she married Liberal politician Jeremy Thorpe, it became their London home until Marion's death in March 2014.

References

Grade II listed buildings in the City of Westminster
Grade II listed houses in London
Houses in the City of Westminster
Houses completed in the 19th century
Bayswater